The Niagara District was a historic district in Upper Canada. Created in 1798 from the Home District, it existed until 1849.

Historic evolution
The District was formed by an Act of the Parliament of Upper Canada in 1798, and was described as consisting of the following territory:

In 1816, the following parts of the District were detached to form Wentworth County in the newly created Gore District:

Upon the passage of the Act of Union 1840, Lincoln County was reorganized into two ridings for electing members to the Legislative Assembly of the Province of Canada, with the 1st and 2nd Ridings becoming the North Riding, and the 3rd and 4th Ridings becoming the South Riding. The South Riding would be detached from Lincoln in 1845, forming the new Welland County.

The district was abolished in 1850, and was replaced by the United Counties of Lincoln, Welland and Haldimand.

Further reading
Armstrong, Frederick H. Handbook of Upper Canadian Chronology. Toronto : Dundurn Press, 1985.

References

Districts of Upper Canada
1798 establishments in Upper Canada
1849 disestablishments in Canada